The Banque de l'Indochine, originally Banque de l'Indo-Chine ("Bank of Indochina"), was a bank created in 1875 in Paris to finance French colonial development in Asia. As a bank of issue in Indochina until 1952 (and in French Pacific territories until 1967), with many features of a central bank, it played a major role in the financial history of French Indochina, French India, New Caledonia, French Polynesia, and Djibouti, as well as French-backed ventures in Siam and China. After World War II, it lost its issuance privilege but reinvented itself as an investment bank in France, and developed new ventures in other countries such as Saudi Arabia and South Africa.

The Compagnie Financière de Suez acquired a controlling interest in the Banque de l'Indochine in 1972, then merged it in 1975 with its own banking subsidiary to form Banque Indosuez, since 1996 itself part of the Crédit Agricole universal banking group.

History

Background and creation

Following the early phases of the French conquest of Vietnam, the Comptoir d'escompte de Paris (CEP) in 1864 opened offices in French Cochinchina, and also developed a presence in Pondicherry, Calcutta, Bombay, Shanghai, Hong Kong, and Yokohama. Meanwhile, the rival Crédit Industriel et Commercial (CIC) had become the Paris correspondent of the Hong Kong and Shanghai Bank, and had powerful political backers in the conservative Catholic administration under France's President Patrice de MacMahon. In the early 1870s, both banks developed competing projects to create an institution that would receive the privilege of issuing money in French Indochina.

In October 1874, the CEP, together with its allies, the Hentsch-Lütscher, Hoskier, and Paccard & Mirabaud merchant banks and the newly created Banque de Paris et des Pays-Bas (BPPB), reached an agreement with the CIC to create the Banque de l'Indochine as a joint venture. On the face of it, CEP and CIC, with their respective allies (including for the CIC the Société Marseillaise de Crédit and the ), controlled equal blocks of shares in the new institution, but CEP was the dominant partner. , the CEP's Chairman and board member of the BPPB, was the new venture's founding chairman, and its founding  (general manager) was the CEP's  Pierre Girod. At its creation, it took ownership of the CEP's former branches in Saigon and Pondicherry. The bank outsourced the production of coins to the Monnaie de Paris and of notes to the Bank of France.

Colonial bank of issue

They were quickly adopted by ethnic-Chinese traders in and around Saigon, who were familiar with banknotes from experience in Hong Kong or Singapore. Even so, the bank's first years of activity were marked by occasional bouts of monetary instability.

Following the Treaty of Tientsin (1885) that concluded the Sino-French War, France consolidated its colonial rule northwards over Annam and Tonkin. Competitors of the CEP, and especially the Société Générale, feared the Banque de l'Indochine would monopolize credit and banking activity in the expanded territory. The French government, whose moderate Republican orientation was supported by the CEP against the more conservative Société Générale, leveraged that situation to encourage the Banque de l'Indochine to increase its credit provision and provide more support to Indochina's economy. Meanwhile, the bank's issuance privilege was extended to Annam and Tonkin in February 1888, as well as to New Caledonia. Following that restructuring, the CEP controlled four of the board's eleven seats, CIC three, and Société Générale and the BPPB one each. The CEP's influence was eclipsed following its collapse in 1889, but it came back as the Comptoir national d'escompte de Paris (CNEP) with one board member in 1890 and retook the Banque de l'Indochine's chairmanship in 1892. From that date, the Banque de l'Indochine effectively became a joint vehicle ("") for the Paris banking community's activities in the Indo-Pacific. That evolution was completed in 1896 as the Crédit Lyonnais, which had expanded into Egypt and India, entered the Bank de l'Indochine's capital and board. The Banque de l'Indochine increasingly behaved as an autonomous actor, shedding its former identity as "daughter of the CEP". The fact that French banks acted together in a single venture, as opposed to competing with each other for banking business in Indochina, may be attributed to the need to face regional rivalry from the powerful British banks such as the Hong Kong and Shanghai Bank, and also by the intrinsic advantage that the bank of issue privilege conferred to its holder against any upstart.

On , for the first time, the Banque de l'Indochine printed its own piastre banknotes at a new facility in Saigon. In 1898, it issued the first banknotes denominated in French Indian rupees.

In 1900, the bank's Shanghai office participated in the financing of the French contribution to the international expeditionary corps that suppressed the Boxer Rebellion, and subsequently represented the interests of the French government in handling the Boxer indemnity. It repeatedly entered new territories at the request of the French government. In July 1908, it thus established an office in Djibouti to co-finance the Compagnie du Chemin de fer de Djibouti à Addis-Abeba, the first-ever bank in the city. In 1918, it opened an office in Vladivostok to serve the Allied military base there during the Siberian intervention.

In July 1921, the Banque Industrielle de Chine (BIDC), which had been created in 1913 to compete with the Banque de l'Indochine for the financing of French ventures in Shanghai and elsewhere in China, collapsed despite the backing it had received from the French Foreign Ministry and the BPPB.

In 1930, in coordination with the French government, the Banque de l'Indochine took the French Indochinese piastre off the silver standard (which it had upheld until then, alone with China which in turn abandoned it in 1935) and into the gold standard. In 1936, the piastre was taken off the gold standard, together with the French franc to which it was kept convertible at a rate of 10 francs for 1 piastre.

Throughout the 1920s, the French Parliament extended the Banque de l'Indochine's issuance privilege only for short periods of time, from 1920 to 1925 on an annual basis, and then every semester, in contrast to earlier long-term extensions. These included six board memberships and the selection of the board chair. The French government initially kept René Jules Thion de la Chaume, a traditional banker, as chairman of the Banque de l'Indochine, but in 1936 replaced him with a lifetime civil servant, Marcel Borduge.

Also in 1931, the Banque de l'Indochine participated in the establishment of the Bank for International Settlements in Basel, and in a capital increase of the State Bank of Morocco, despite the latter being under the BPPB's dominant influence.

World War II

During World War II, the Banque de l'Indochine was chaired by Paul Baudoin, who in the summer of 1940 was the first Foreign Minister of Vichy France. In 1941, the Banque de l'Indochine was allowed to acquire an equity stake in its rival the Banque de Paris et des Pays-Bas. The chief executive, in contrast to Baudoin, was involved in the French Resistance. Largely thanks to him, the bank avoided participation in the worst aspects of collaboration while providing some support to the Resistance. In August 1944, its Paris headquarters was the venue for the negotiation between Swedish diplomat Raoul Nordling and German commander Dietrich von Choltitz to limit bloodshed during the Liberation of Paris. The Banque de l'Indochine, like the BPPB, was subsequently able to escape nationalization following the liberation of France, even though Baudoin was sentenced to Indignité nationale.

In 1940 the bank established offices in London and Yokohama, and in November 1942 relocated the latter to Tokyo until it closed in September 1945. Under Japanese occupation, the bank's offices in Hong Kong and Singapore ceased activity in early 1942, and those in China were reduced to near-complete paralysis. In Pondicherry, the news of the armistice of 22 June 1940 were met with panic and triggered a bank run on the Banque de l'Indochine. This in turn played a role in the decision by Louis Bonvin, Governor of French India, to reverse his prior allegiance to Vichy France and rally to Free France, which allowed the bank to receive financial support from the British Raj.

Postwar history

The future of the Banque de l'Indochine was vividly debated in the new political context created by the liberation of France. In 1945, the French government decided to revalue the French Indochinese piastre to a rate of 17 French francs to one piastre, up from 10, a decision that initiated a bout of trafficking and corruption that would become known as the piastres affair; that same year, the CFP franc replaced the piastre as the currency of French Polynesia and New Caledonia. In 1947, following protracted negotiations, the Banque de l'Indochine approved the decision to buy back the French government's 20 percent equity stake, despite a steep price imposed by Finance Minister Maurice Schumann. Meanwhile, the Banque de l'Indochine developed its activity, as an increasingly active investment bank in France, and a retail and commercial bank internationally, both in the colonies rebranded as French Union and in other countries, such as South Africa.

The bank's activities in mainland China were partly revived after the defeat of Japan in 1945 (as were the offices in Hong Kong and Singapore), kept for a while after the Communist victory of the Chinese Civil War in 1949, but eventually liquidated in the 1950s. Meanwhile, the bank endeavored to diversify away from its traditional colonial turf. In 1946 it established itself in Addis Ababa (Ethiopia), where it stayed until 1963, and for a few years in the early 1950s also in Dire Dawa. In Saudi Arabia, it opened a branch in Jeddah in 1947, followed by Dammam and Khobar-Dhahran in the 1950s. It was also briefly established in Al Hudaydah, Yemen ca. 1949–1951. It created subsidiaries in San Francisco (French American Banking Corporation) in 1947 and Johannesburg (French Bank of South Africa) in 1949. In the New Hebrides, now Vanuatu, it established a branch in Port Vila in 1948, and an office in Luganville in the 1950s. It also opened locations in Malaysia in 1951, Tokyo (again) in 1953, and Lausanne in 1957.

Even so, Indochina still represented more than half of the bank's income in the early 1950s. In 1953, the bank opened a branch in Vientiane, Laos. On , the Banque de l'Indochine sold several of its properties, including its main office building in Saigon, to the National Bank of Vietnam, the central bank of the newly established Republic of Vietnam.

In 1954–1955, the Banque de l'Indochine also ceased its activity in Pondicherry following the de facto end of French India; its branch was acquired by Indian Overseas Bank. In 1963, its activity in Cambodia was nationalized.

By the early 1950s, the Banque de l'Indochine also had a broad network of minority stakes in other banks, including the Banque de Paris et des Pays-Bas (acquired in 1941), Banque industrielle de l'Afrique du Nord (Algeria), Banque commerciale africaine (West and Central Africa), Bank Sabbag (Lebanon), and Franco-Chinese Bank, among others. In 1960, it took over the Franco-Chinese Bank by purchasing the shares formerly held by Banque de Paris et des Pays-Bas and Banque Lazard.

Merger into Banque Indosuez

In 1966, to prevent an outright takeover of military-industrial concern Schneider by Belgium's Empain group, the Banque de l'Indochine acquired 10 percent of Schneider's capital. As a consequence of that transaction, Empain took 11 percent of the bank's own capital. Its chairman  then attempted to counter Empain's influence in the bank (as the rest of the shareholder base was highly dispersed) by inviting the Compagnie Financière de Suez, with which the bank had several common business interests, to invest in it as well. In January 1967, Suez acquired 7 percent of the bank's capital, the same amount as held by Empain by then. De Flers subsequently invited La Paternelle, an insurer, to acquire a further 4 percent of the bank's capital, thus consolidating a group of friendly shareholders. In late 1969, the Assurances du groupe de Paris (AGP), a holding company that had been formed in the meantime and owned La Paternelle, owned 22 percent of the Banque de l'Indochine, and by 1972, 45 percent. That year, AGP sold its stake to the Compagnie Financière de Suez. In 1975, the latter merged the Banque de l'Indochine with its subsidiary the Banque de Suez et de l'Union des Mines, to form Banque Indosuez.

Sites
The Banque de l'Indochine used or commissioned a number of prominent buildings, some of which are notable exemplars of French colonial architecture.

Paris

Originally, the bank was established at 34, rue Laffitte, in a building that was later demolished. In July 1902, it moved to a new headquarter building nearby on 15 bis, rue Laffitte, designed by Henri Paul Nénot and whose exterior still survives.

In March 1922, the bank moved to a new and larger building started in 1913 but whose construction was interrupted by World War I, on 96 boulevard Haussmann, designed by architect René Patouillard-Demoriane. That building remained the seat of Banque Indosuez until the late 1990s. It was largely rebuilt behind the preserved original façade in the mid-2000s, on a design by Jean-Jacques Ory.

Indochina

Its latest reconstruction on the same site, by the  using granite from Biên Hòa, was completed in late 1930 and inaugurated in 1931. It was designed in ostentatious neoclassical style by architect , with some exterior details inspired by Cham and Khmer architecture, and a large art deco atrium.

That building was sold and transferred in 1955 to the National Bank of Vietnam, the Republic of Vietnam's new central bank, and in July 1976 was taken over by the State Bank of Vietnam following the Fall of Saigon. In 2016, the Vietnamese authorities added the building to the list of protected national relics.

The previous seat was converted into housing for the bank's employees. In 1954, the Hanoi branch was taken over by the National Bank of Vietnam (Ngân hàng Quốc gia Việt Nam, renamed the State Bank of Vietnam in 1960) and has been the central bank's head office since then.

It has been used by the State Bank of Vietnam since 1955.

The office of the Banque de l'Indochine in Phnom Penh was built in the early 1890s and rebuilt in the early 20th century. In 1965, Cambodian industrialist Van Thuan acquired it and made it the headquarters of his enterprises. He relocated in Hong Kong in 1969, and his Cambodian properties were expropriated in 1975 by the Khmer Rouge regime. The building was then taken over by the National Bank of Cambodia. In 2003, Van Thuan's family bought back the building from the Cambodian authorities and subsequently renovated it. His daughter Van Porleng opened a French fine dining restaurant there, branded Van's, in December 2007.

Thailand

The branch building in Bangkok, in Bang Rak district, was completed in 1908. It was constructed by the engineering firm Howarth Erskine, and formed an imposing neoclassical edifice on the bank of the Chao Phraya River. It stands next to the East Asiatic Building at the end of Soi Charoen Krung 40, and now houses offices of the Roman Catholic Archdiocese of Bangkok.

China

The bank's building in Shanghai, on No.29 Bund, was completed in 1914 on a design by the local Atkinson & Dallas architecture firm. It is now the Shanghai Bund (Waitan) subbranch of China Everbright Bank.

The polychrome brick building of the Banque de l'Indochine in the French concession of Hankou, on the "French Bund" embankment of the Yangtze river, was constructed in 1901-1902 and has been carefully restored.

In the Legation Quarter of Beijing, the bank acquired the former building of the short-lived legation of the Korean Empire, which had closed in 1905, and established its office there in 1908. It rebuilt the office in Western classical style in 1917, on the same location.

The bank's building in the French concession of Tianjin was completed in late 1908. The Banque de l'Indochine kept staff there until the second half of the 1950s. It was later used as a venue by the Tianjin Fine Arts Museum.

India

The bank's branch in Pondicherry was rebuilt in 1916 on the south side of the city's central Bharati Park. It is now the local office of UCO Bank.

French Polynesia

The bank's main branch in French Polynesia has been located on the same site, just south of Papeete's Notre Dame Cathedral, since its establishment in 1904. It has been rebuilt on several occasions.

Djibouti

In 1954, the bank relocated to a new international style office, which it had built on the site of the former  nearby on 10, . This building was later used and remodeled by the Banque pour le Commerce et l'Industrie – Mer Rouge, which in June 2020 sold it to Djibouti's National Social Security Fund.

Leadership

The bank's two key leadership positions were that of chairman and chief executive or general manager.

Chairmen

  (January 1875-March 1889)
  (March 1889-April 1892)
  (June 1892-late 1889 or early 1900)
  (late 1889 or early 1900-June 1920)
  (June 1920-March 1927)
 Stanislas Simon (May 1927-July 1931)
Interim (July 1931-July 1932)
 René Jules Thion de la Chaume (July 1932-November 1936)
 Marcel Borduge (November 1936-February 1941)
 Paul Baudoin (February 1941-September 1944)
 Emile Minost (April 1945 – 1960)
  (1960-1974)
 Jean Maxime-Robert (1974-1975)

Chief executives
 René Jules Thion de la Chaume (June 1920-July 1931), also board member from June 1930,  in 1931, and chairman in 1932
 Paul Baudoin (July 1931-March 1940), also board member from November 1936, and chairman in 1941
  (March 1940-September 1952)
  (October 1952 – 1960)
 Jean Maxime-Robert (1960-1974)

Banknotes

In addition to its issuance privilege in French colonies, the Banque de l’Indochine, like other foreign banks in China at the time, issued paper currency in the concessions where it had established branch offices.

See also

 Paper money of the Qing dynasty
 Imperial Ottoman Bank
 National Bank of Haiti
 Banque de l'Afrique Occidentale
 State Bank of Morocco
 Banque de Madagascar
 Société financière française et coloniale

References

External links
 

Defunct banks of France
French colonisation in Asia
French Indochina
Concessions in China
History of French Polynesia
History of New Caledonia
Economy of Djibouti
French India